The Warm Fork Spring River is a stream in Oregon County, Missouri and northern Fulton County, Arkansas. The stream begins in western Oregon County at the confluence of Howell Creek and Elk Creek and the stream becomes the Spring River at its confluence with the cold springwaters of Mammoth Spring in northern Fulton County.

The stream was named due to the temperature difference between its waters and the cold springwaters entering from Mammoth Spring.  This is the only stream of this name in the United States.

Variant names
According to the Geographic Names Information System, it has also been known historically as:
 Spring River

See also
 List of rivers of Missouri
 List of rivers of Arkansas

References

Rivers of Oregon County, Missouri
Rivers of Fulton County, Arkansas
Rivers of Missouri
Rivers of Arkansas